The Casa Villavicencio or Casa V is an old Spanish Colonial Era house in Taal, Batangas, Philippines. Built in 1850, the house was given to Don Eulalio Villavicencio upon the death of his parents. In 1919, Governor General Francis B. Harrison slept in the house as a guest of Sen. Vicente Ilustre, son-in-law of Doña Gliceria, to inaugurate the electric plant in Taal.

History
In 1850, the parents of Don Eulalio Villavicencio, from their 1820s home behind the Casa Tribunal (now the Municipal Building), decided to build a new house with no adjoining neighbors. The new house stood to what is now the G. Marella Street corner Del Castillo. The house later went to Don Eulalio upon the death of his parents who moved to the older but larger dwelling to accommodate his large family. In January 1892, upon the visit of Juan and Antonio Luna to raise fund for the Propaganda Movement, the couple donated a sum of P18,000. In gratitude, Juan Luna gifted the couple with portraits.

In 1896, Eulalio was arrested for illegal complicity in the Katipunan and was imprisoned for two years in Fort Santiago. Eulalio died shortly after his release due to the privation suffered during his incarceration. Because of the death of her husband, Doña Gliceria, became a more rabid nationalist to the extent of holding clandestine meetings in the house with revolutionary leaders of Batangas. She also organized the Batalyong Maluya to fight the Spaniards. With her considerable resources, Doña Gliceria provided food and arms to the revolutionaries. She also generously donated Bulusan, one her stem ships, to the newly proclaimed Malolos Republic. Converted into a war vessel, it became the first ship of the fledgling Philippine Navy.

During the Philippine–American War, she actively supported the guerrillas under General Malvar. The Americans kept close watch on her to the extent of posting guards in the adjoining Villavicencio-Marella House.

In 1919. Governor General Francis B. Harrison slept in the house as a guest of Se. Vicente Ilustre, son-in-law of Doña Gliceria. to inaugurate he electric plant in Taal, the first town in the Batangas province to have electricity. In anticipation of the visit, black-and-white Machuca tiles were laid in the zaguan. The original painted canvas ceilings of the formal rooms upstairs were removed and replaced with stamped tin imported from the United States. The walls of the caida and the sala we re-stretchered with new canvass and painted with Art Nouveau motifs by Emilio Alvero. The lot along Del Castillo Street was fences with wrought-iron grilles ad landscaped. A fountain featuring a giant clam shell graced the center of the garden.

The house like most dwellings in Taal, survived the Japanese Occupation relatively unscathed, except for the loss of the floorboards of the large comedor or the dining room that ran the whole width of the house. Since the family all lived in Manina after World War II, the house was not lived for almost half a century.

Upon partition of the communal property in 1990, the house went to the heirs of Don Sixto Villavicencio, Don Eulalio's son. Edgrado Villavicencio, Don Sixto's only son, inherited the house and began restoring it. When the monument of Doña Gliceria Marella de Villavicencio was erected by the National Historical Institute, the garden was raised to street level and the fountain was buried under the landfill. The covered bridged that used to connect the old house and wedding gift house, which had become dangerously decrepit was demolished.

The house is presently owned and managed by Edgardo's son, Ernesto Villacicencio with his wife Maris Rosario Benedicto.

Architecture and style
The house typical three-bayed bahay na bato, its ground-floor walls of  adobe blocks support an upper story of carved acanthus consoles of molaveseemingy support the windows sills. The Ventanilla or "little windows" beneath the window sill are a typical of the 1850s. The ogee arches carved on the doors were inspired on the facade of Bauan Church, where it first appeared in Batangas. The doors of the central bay lead to a short flight of stairs to the meseta or landing with its doors opening to the entresuelo or mezzanine chamber that had capiz windows opening to the zaguan and a window on the street side with a wrought iron rejas na buntis. From the meseta, a flight of balayong stairs led to the wide caida with its panoramic view of Balayan Bay.

The hardwood floors of the upper floors, the elaborately carved and gilded foliated transoms over the double doors carved with ogee panels in the formal rooms and walls and ceilings stretched with handpainted canvas are typical of the 1850s Taal houses.

References

External links 

Heritage Houses in the Philippines
Buildings and structures in Taal, Batangas